UEFA Group 3 of the 2019 FIFA Women's World Cup qualification competition consisted of five teams: Norway, the Netherlands, the Republic of Ireland, Slovakia, and Northern Ireland. The composition of the seven groups in the qualifying group stage was decided by the draw held on 25 April 2017, with the teams seeded according to their coefficient ranking.

The group was played in home-and-away round-robin format between 15 September 2017 and 4 September 2018. The group winners qualified for the final tournament, while the runners-up advanced to the play-offs if they were one of the four best runners-up among all seven groups (not counting results against the fifth-placed team).

Standings

Matches
Times are CET/CEST, as listed by UEFA (local times, if different, are in parentheses).

Goalscorers

Notes

References

External links
FIFA Women's World Cup Standings: 2017–19 qualifying, UEFA.com

Group 3
Norway at the 2019 FIFA Women's World Cup
Netherlands at the 2019 FIFA Women's World Cup